Tetraodon schoutedeni is a species of pufferfish native to Africa's Congo Basin.

This species is named in honour of the Belgian zoologist Henri Schouteden.

In captivity
During the 1960s the Tetraodon schoutedeni was among the most commonly kept species of freshwater pufferfish in the ornamental fish trade and a species which was commonly bred in captivity.

As a result of exports in wild caught fish being drastically reduced during the Congo Crisis and other events of civil war in the region, the species virtually disappeared from the fishkeeping hobby. However, exports of wild caught examples are now becoming very common and the species has been subject to several captive breeding endeavours. As a consequence there has been a sharp rise in the popularity of this species since circa 2018.

One catalyst of their popularity has been the erroneous claim that they are a very peaceful species, exhibiting no aggression towards conspecifics and allspecifics alike. The Tetraodon schoutedeni is very capable of unprovoked aggression and they are observed to be a loosely social species. It is recommended that they are kept either singularly or in a group consisting of at least six conspecifics, to evenly distribute aggression, with a female to male ratio of 2:1.

Diet
In the wild this species preys upon freshwater snails, other benthic animals and insect larvae. In captivity is recommended to feed them snails, earthworm, fresh insects and insect-based foods.

References

Tetraodontidae
Taxa named by Jacques Pellegrin
Fish described in 1926